The 1937 Tulane Green Wave football team represented Tulane University as a member of the Southeastern Conference (SEC) during the 1937 college football season. Led by second-year head coach Red Dawson, the Green Wave played their home games at Tulane Stadium in New Orleans. Tulane finished the season with an overall record of 5–4–1 and a mark of 2–3–1 in conference play, placing ninth in the SEC.

Schedule

References

Tulane
Tulane Green Wave football seasons
Tulane Green Wave football